Robert McDermott may refer to:

Bobby McDermott (1914–1963), American basketball player
Robert A. McDermott, American philosopher, professor of philosophy and religion at the California Institute of Integral Studies
Robert F. McDermott (1920–2006), American Brigadier General, chairman of United Services Automobile Association
 Robert J. McDermott, American health educator